James Madison Hemings (January 19, 1805 – November 28, 1877) was the son of the mixed-race enslaved woman Sally Hemings and her enslaver, President Thomas Jefferson. He was the third of her four children to survive to adulthood. Born into slavery, according to partus sequitur ventrem, Hemings grew up on Jefferson's Monticello plantation, where his mother was enslaved. After some light duties as a young boy, Hemings became a carpenter and fine woodwork apprentice at around age 14 and worked in the joiner's shop until he was about 21. He learned to play the violin and was able to earn money by growing cabbages. Jefferson died in 1826, after which Sally Hemings was "given her time" by Jefferson's surviving daughter Martha Jefferson Randolph.

The historical question of whether Jefferson was the father of Sally Hemings' children is the subject of the Jefferson–Hemings controversy. At the age of 68, Hemings claimed the connection in an 1873 Ohio newspaper interview, titled, "Life Among the Lowly," which attracted national and international attention. Following renewed historical analysis in the late 20th century, and a 1998 DNA study (completed in 1999 and published as a report in 2000) that found a match between the Jefferson male line and a descendant of Sally Hemings' youngest son, Eston Hemings, the Monticello Foundation asserted that Jefferson fathered Eston and likely her other five children as well.

After Hemings and his younger brother Eston were freed, they each worked and married free women of color; they lived with their families and mother Sally in Charlottesville until her death in 1835. Both brothers moved with their young families to Chillicothe, Ohio to live in a free state. Hemings and his wife Mary lived there the remainder of their lives; he worked as a farmer and highly skilled carpenter. Among their ten children were two sons who served the Union Army in the Civil War: one in the United States Colored Troops and one who enlisted as a white man in the regular army.

Among Madison and Mary Hemings' grandchildren was Frederick Madison Roberts, the first African American elected to office on the West Coast. He served in the California legislature for nearly two decades. In 2010, their descendant Shay Banks-Young, who identifies as African American, together with one Wayles and one Hemings descendant, who each identify as European American, received the international "Search for Common Ground" award for work among the Jefferson descendants and the public to bridge gaps and heal "the legacy of slavery." They founded "The Monticello Community" for descendants of all the people who lived and worked there in Jefferson's lifetime.

Slavery 

James Madison Hemings was born into slavery at Monticello, where his mother Sally Hemings was a mixed-race enslaved woman inherited by Martha Wayles Skelton, the wife of Thomas Jefferson. Sally and Martha were half-sisters, both fathered by the planter John Wayles. Sally worked in the main house as a domestic servant. Jefferson's wife Martha died on September 6, 1782. While in Paris, from 1787 to 1789, Sally Hemings cared for Jefferson's daughters. She lived her teenage years as a free person in France, where there was no slavery. According to Hemings's memoir, his mother told him that his father was Thomas Jefferson, and that their relationship had started in Paris, where he was serving as a diplomat, having been appointed the Minister to France in 1784. Pregnant, she agreed to return with Jefferson to the United States based on his promise to free her children when they came of age at 21. Sally returned to Monticello and remained a domestic servant in the main house and she also became Jefferson's chambermaid. Her living quarters, located in the South Wing, adjacent to Jefferson's bedchamber, were built in 1809. Although there was no window to the outside, it likely gave her and her children a higher-level lifestyle than other enslaved people at Monticello.

Hemings referred to Sally Hemings as "mother" and Jefferson as "father", who treated one another with respect. Hemings described Jefferson as even-tempered and "uniformly kind". He compared Jefferson's affectionate treatment of his white grandchildren to that of the Hemings children, who were not treated with affection or partiality. Henry Wiencek asserts that while Jefferson felt no emotion when he saw "eternal monotony" in the faces of black-skinned enslaved people, seeing himself in the faces of the Hemings children, who were enslaved, caused him to remain emotionally distant from his off-spring with Sally.

Hemings grew up at Monticello with an older brother Beverley, older sister Harriet, and a younger brother Eston. Two or more other siblings died young. Sally and her four surviving children were listed together in Jefferson's Farm Book at Monticello in 1810. The children were fair-skinned and some bore a remarkable resemblance to Jefferson. Jefferson's grandchildren were not told that they were related to the Hemings children.

Hemings was named for Jefferson's close friend, James Madison. According to Hemings, Dolley Madison requested the honor of his being named after her husband, who was afterwards President of the United States. As a young child, Hemings and his siblings stayed in or near the main house, sometimes running errands. Unlike other enslaved children, they had light work, were able to stay near their mother, and knew that they would be freed upon coming of age. Hemings learned to read and write from white children and was partially self-taught. At the age of 12 or 14, Hemings was apprenticed to his uncle, Sally's brother John Hemings, to learn carpentry and fine woodworking. Beverley and Eston were also apprentices. The brothers worked in the joiner's shop at Poplar Forest and Monticello in total from 1810 to 1826. By 1824, Jefferson gave Hemings and his younger brother a patch of land to grow vegetables. At harvest, the boys were paid for 100 heads of cabbage. All three of the Hemings brothers learned to play the violin, the instrument associated with Jefferson. As an adult, Eston Hemings made a living as a musician. Their sister, Harriet, learned to weave.

Hemings stated that Beverley and Harriet moved to Washington D.C. in 1822 when they "ran away" from Monticello. Jefferson ensured that Harriet was given $50 for her journey to Washington, D.C. Because of their light skin and appearance (they were 7/8 European or octoroon), both identified with the white community and probably changed their names. After Beverley had left, Jefferson updated his Farm Book with his name and "runaway 22". Harriet's leaving was similarly recorded. Hemings said they had married white spouses of good circumstances, and moved into white society. They apparently kept their paternity a secret, as it would have revealed their origins as slaves.

Freedom 
According to the terms of Jefferson's will, twenty-one-year-old Madison Hemings and his brother Eston were emancipated in 1827. As stipulated in Jefferson's will, the state legislature was petitioned to allow the brothers, their mother, and Joseph Fossett to remain in the state after the one-year residency limit for freedmen. The Hemings rented a house in Charlottesville, where Sally lived with them. At the age of 50, she was considered an old woman in the slave trade. She was not formally freed but was "given her time" by Jefferson's surviving daughter Martha Jefferson Randolph, who was also Hemings' niece. Sally Heming's children were the only family unit freed (or helped to escape) by Jefferson. In the 1830 Albemarle County census, Madison, Eston and Sally Hemings were all classified as free whites, sometimes they were classified as mixed race. Sally Hemings died in Charlotte in 1835. During their time in Charlottesville, Hemings had built a wood and brick house on Main Street.

Married life
On November 21, 1831, Madison wed Mary Hughes McCoy, a free woman of mixed-race ancestry (her grandfather Samuel Hughes, a white planter, freed her grandmother Chana from slavery and had children with her). 

In 1836, Hemings, his wife, and their infant daughter Sarah left Charlottesville for Pike County, Ohio. Eston and his family—and Mary's family—had already moved there. They lived in Chillicothe, which had a thriving free black community, abolitionists among both races, and a station of the Underground Railroad. Surviving records in Pike County state that Hemings purchased  for $150 on July 22, 1856, sold the same area for $250 on December 30, 1859, and purchased  for $10 per acre on September 25, 1865 in Ross County, Ohio. During that time, Hemings helped build houses in Waverly, Ohio, which was known for its anti-black sentiment.

Madison and Mary Hemings were the parents of nine children: Sarah, Thomas Eston, Harriet, Mary Ann, Catherine Jane, William Beverly, James Madison, Julia Ann, and Ellen Wayles Hemings. Their daughter Sarah was born in Virginia; the rest of the children were born in Ohio. Hemings had a quiet life as a modestly successful free black farmer and carpenter.

Following passage of the Fugitive Slave Act of 1850, Eston and his family moved in 1852 to Madison, Wisconsin, to get further from possible danger from slave catchers. Slave catchers were known to kidnap free black people and sell them into slavery, as demand and prices were high in the Deep South. Eston lived as a white man in Wisconsin. Of Sally Hemings' children, Hemings was the only one that lived among African Americans after he attained his freedom. (In September 1831, in his mid-twenties, Madison Hemings was described in a special census of the State of Virginia as being: 5 feet 7 3/8 inches high light complexion no scars or marks perceivable". Forty-two years later, a journalist described him as "five feet ten inches in height, sparely made, with sandy complexion and a mild gray eye.")

In 1873, Hemings used an Ohio newspaper interview about his life, titled, "Life Among the Lowly," to address the Jefferson/Hemings controversy, stating that Jefferson was his and his three siblings' father. Hemings was a widower when he died of consumption on November 28, 1877 in Huntington Township, Ross County, Ohio.

Jefferson–Hemings controversy 

Sally Hemings had at least six children whose births were recorded. Some sources, including Hemings's memoir, says that Sally Hemings conceived her first child while in Paris with Jefferson, but that the baby died shortly after birth. Another daughter named Harriet, whose birth was recorded at the time, also died shortly after birth, but four other children lived to adulthood, three boys and one girl:  Beverly, Harriet (the second daughter given this name), Madison, and Eston. Beverly and Harriet left Monticello to go North when they were both around twenty-one years of age, but Madison and Eston were freed by Jefferson's will after he died. Although Jefferson did not legally manumit Beverly and Harriet, he secretly arranged and paid for Harriet's transportation to Philadelphia, using his overseer Edmund Bacon as an intermediary. Although he marked in his Farm Book that both had "run away," Jefferson never made any attempt to re-enslave them. Gordon-Reed noted that this Hemings family was the only one in which all the children were freed, and Harriet the only enslaved woman he freed. She suggests this special treatment was significant and related to their status as his "natural" children.

Largely as a result of revived interest in this case following Gordon-Reed's book, a Y-DNA analysis of Carr, Jefferson and Hemings descendants was conducted in 1998. Y-DNA is passed on virtually unchanged through the direct male line. It showed no match between the Carr male line, proposed for more than 150 years as the father(s), and the one Hemings descendant tested. It did show a match between the Y-DNA haplotype of the Jefferson male line and the Hemings descendant, which is a rare type.

Since 1998 and the DNA study, which affirmed the historical evidence, many historians have accepted that the widower Jefferson had a long, sexual relationship with Hemings, and fathered six children with her, four of whom survived to adulthood. The Thomas Jefferson Foundation (TJF), which runs Monticello, conducted an independent historic review in 2000, as did the National Genealogical Society in 2001; the scholars of both reviews concluded Jefferson was probably the father of all Hemings's children.

There are no living male-line descendants of Madison Hemings. Beverley Hemings' descendants have been lost to history, as he apparently changed his name after moving to Washington, DC and passing into white society. Descendants of Madison Hemings declined to have the remains of his son William Hemings disturbed to extract DNA for testing (he was buried in the Leavenworth National Cemetery, just as Wayles-Jefferson descendants declined to have Thomas Jefferson's remains disturbed.

In 2012, the Smithsonian Institution and the Thomas Jefferson Foundation held a major exhibit at the National Museum of American History: Slavery at Jefferson's Monticello: The Paradox of Liberty. It said that "evidence strongly support[s] the conclusion that Jefferson was the father of Sally Hemings' children."

Descendants 
Madison Hemings' youngest daughter Ellen Wayles Hemings married Andrew Jackson Roberts, a graduate of Oberlin College. They moved from Ohio to Los Angeles, California in 1885 with their first son Frederick, age six. The senior Roberts founded the first black-owned mortuary there and became a civic leader in the developing community. Their son, Frederick Madison Roberts, named for his maternal grandfather, was college-educated and became a businessman in partnership with his father. He also became a community leader. In 1918 Roberts was first elected to the California legislature. He was re-elected numerous times, serving for a total of 16 years, and becoming known as "dean of the assembly". He is believed to have been the first person of African-American ancestry elected to political office west of the Mississippi River. Both he and his brother William Giles Roberts graduated from college. The Roberts descendants for generations have had a strong tradition of college education and public service. Their daughter Mary Ann Johnson left the state of Ohio, but the remainder of their children stayed in southern Ohio.

Many of the Hemings' descendants who remained in Ohio were interviewed in the late twentieth century by two Monticello researchers as part of the Thomas Jefferson Foundation's "Getting Word" project. They were collecting oral histories from the descendants of enslaved families at Monticello; material has been added to the Monticello website and was included in the national Slavery at Jefferson's Monticello 2012 exhibit. The researchers found that Hemings' descendants had married within the mixed-race community for generations, choosing light-skinned spouses of an educated class and identifying as people of color within the black community.

In 2010 Shay Banks-Young and Julia Jefferson Westerinen, descendants of Sally Hemings who identify as black and white, respectively, were honored together with David Works, a descendant of  Martha Wayles Skelton Jefferson, with the Search for Common Ground award for "their work to bridge the divide within their family and heal the legacy of slavery." They have spoken about race and their historically divided and united family, and have been featured on NPR and in other interviews across the country.

Notes

References

Bibliography

Further reading 
 Shannon Lanier and Jane Feldman, Jefferson's Children: The Story of One American Family New York: Random House Books for Young Readers, 2000 (with photos of Jefferson descendants on both sides)
 Stanton, Lucia. Free Some Day: The African-American Families of Monticello, Charlottesville: Thomas Jefferson Foundation, 2000.

External links 
 "Getting Word: African American Family Histories", Monticello Website
 François Furstenberg, "Jefferson's Other Family: His concubine was also his wife's half-sister", review of Annette Gordon-Reed, The Hemingses of Monticello, Slate, 23 September 2008
 "Sally Hemings Children: Madison Hemings", Photos - Descendants of Madison Hemings, Monticello Website
 "Scholars Commission Report", Thomas Jefferson Heritage Society

 Bibliography of Hemings – Jefferson Sources, University of Virginia Library

1805 births
1877 deaths
19th-century American slaves
Children of presidents of the United States
Children of vice presidents of the United States
Place of death missing
Children of Thomas Jefferson
Children of Sally Hemings
Hemings family
Jefferson family
19th-century American people
People from Monticello